The Damba festival is celebrated by the chiefs and peoples of   the Northern, Savanna, North East  and Upper West Regions of Ghana. The name Damba in Dagbani, Damma in Mampruli and Jingbenti in Waali. The festival is celebrated in the Dagomba lunar month of Damba, corresponding to the third month of the Islamic calendar, Rabia al-Awwal. Damba is celebrated to mark the birth and naming of Muhammad, but the actual content of the celebration is a glorification of the chieftaincy, not specific Islamic motifs. The Damba is also celebrated among the Gonjas of the Savanna region. The Gonjas normally have a specific month of which the  celebrate the festival. The festival is categorized into three sessions; the Somo Damba, the Naa Damba and the Belkulsi.

Activities 
The festival starts on the 10th day of the month of Damba with the “Somo” Damba, followed by the ‘Naa’ Kings Damba on the 17th day, with the “bielkulsi”, which is the climax of the celebration, coming off on the 18th of the month of Damba. within this period, prayers are offered to ancestors, drumming and dancing, families pay visits to friends and exchange gifts.

See also
Bugum Chugu
Dagbon music and dance
World Damba Festival

References

External link

Festivals in Ghana
Dagbon